Erik Brandt may refer to:

 Erik Gottfrid Christian Brandt (1884–1955), Swedish politician
 Erik Rud Brandt (born 1943), Danish fashion designer